The Catcher in the Rye is an American novel by J. D. Salinger that was partially published in serial form 1945–46 before being novelized in 1951. Originally intended for adults, it is often read by adolescents for its themes of angst and alienation, and as a critique of superficiality in society. The novel also deals with complex issues of innocence, identity, belonging, loss, connection, sex, and depression. The main character, Holden Caulfield, has become an icon for teenage rebellion. Caulfield, nearly of age, gives his opinion on just about everything as he narrates his recent life events.

The Catcher has been translated widely. About one million copies are sold each year, with total sales of more than 65 million books. The novel was included on Times 2005 list of the 100 best English-language novels written since 1923, and it was named by Modern Library and its readers as one of the 100 best English-language novels of the 20th century. In 2003, it was listed at number 15 on the BBC's survey "The Big Read".

Plot
Holden Caulfield recalls the events of a weekend (Saturday afternoon to Monday afternoon) shortly before the previous year's Christmas, beginning at Pencey Preparatory Academy, a boarding school in Pennsylvania that Salinger may have based on the Valley Forge Military Academy and College. Holden has just been expelled from Pencey because he had failed all of his classes except English. After causing the fencing team to forfeit a fencing match in New York because he accidentally lost the team’s equipment on the subway, he says goodbye to his history teacher, Mr. Spencer, who is a well-meaning but long-winded old man. Spencer offers him advice and simultaneously embarrasses Holden by criticizing his history exam.

Back at his dorm, Holden's dorm neighbor, Robert Ackley, who is unpopular among his peers, disturbs Holden with his impolite questioning and mannerisms. Holden, who feels sorry for Ackley, tolerates his presence. Later, Holden agrees to write an English composition for his roommate, Ward Stradlater, who is leaving for a date. Holden and Stradlater normally hang out well together, and Holden admires Stradlater's physique. He is distressed to learn that Stradlater's date is Jane Gallagher, with whom Holden was infatuated and whom he feels the need to protect. That night, Holden decides to go to a Cary Grant comedy with Mal Brossard and Ackley. Since Ackley and Mal had already seen the film, they ended up eating food, playing pinball for a while, and returning to Pencey. When Stradlater returns hours later, he fails to appreciate the deeply personal composition Holden wrote for him about the baseball glove of Holden's late brother Allie who died from leukemia a few years previously, and refuses to say whether he had sex with Jane. Enraged, Holden punches him, and Stradlater easily wins the fight. When Holden continues insulting him, Stradlater leaves him lying on the floor with a bloody nose. Fed up with the "phonies" at Pencey Prep, Holden decides to leave Pencey early and catches a train to New York. Holden intends to stay away from his home until Wednesday, when his parents will have received notification of his expulsion. Aboard the train, Holden meets the mother of a wealthy, obnoxious Pencey student, Ernest Morrow, and makes up nice but false stories about her son.

In a taxicab, Holden asks the driver whether the ducks in the Central Park lagoon migrate during winter, a subject he brings up often, but the man barely responds. Holden checks into the Edmont Hotel and spends an evening dancing with three tourists at the hotel lounge. Holden is disappointed that they are unable to hold a conversation. Following an unpromising visit to a nightclub, Holden becomes preoccupied with his internal angst and agrees to have a prostitute named Sunny visit his room. His attitude toward the girl changes when she enters the room and takes off her clothes. Holden, who is a virgin, says he only wants to talk, which annoys her and causes her to leave. Even though he maintains that he paid her the right amount for her time, she returns with her pimp Maurice and demands more money. Holden insults Maurice, Sunny takes money from Holden's wallet, and Maurice snaps his fingers on Holden's groin and punches him in the stomach. Afterward, Holden imagines that he has been shot by Maurice and pictures murdering him with an automatic pistol.

The next morning, Holden, becoming increasingly depressed and needing personal connection, calls Sally Hayes, a familiar date. Although Holden claims that she is "the queen of all phonies," they agree to meet that afternoon to attend a play at the Biltmore Theater. Holden shops for a special record, "Little Shirley Beans", for his 10-year-old sister Phoebe. He spots a small boy singing "If a body catch a body coming through the rye", which lifts his mood. After the play, Holden and Sally go ice skating at Rockefeller Center, where Holden suddenly begins ranting against society and frightens Sally. He impulsively invites Sally to run away with him that night to live in the wilderness of New England, but she is uninterested in his hastily conceived plan and declines. The conversation turns sour, and the two angrily part ways.

Holden decides to meet his old classmate, Carl Luce, for drinks at the Wicker Bar. Holden annoys Carl, whom Holden suspects of being gay, by insistently questioning him about his sex life. Before leaving, Luce says that Holden should go see a psychiatrist, to understand himself better. After Luce leaves, Holden gets drunk, awkwardly flirts with several adults, and calls an icy Sally. Exhausted and out of money, Holden wanders over to Central Park to investigate the ducks, accidentally breaking Phoebe's record on the way. Nostalgic, he heads home to see his sister Phoebe. He sneaks into his parents' apartment while they are out and wakes up Phoebe—the only person with whom he seems to be able to communicate his true feelings. Although Phoebe is happy to see Holden, she quickly infers that he has been expelled and chastises him for his aimlessness and his apparent disdain for everything. When asked if he cares about anything, Holden shares a selfless fantasy he has been thinking about (based on a mishearing of Robert Burns's Comin' Through the Rye), in which he imagines himself as making a job of saving children running through a field of rye by catching them before they fell off a nearby cliff (a "catcher in the rye"). Phoebe points out that the actual poem says, "when a body meet a body, comin through the rye." Holden breaks down in tears, and his sister tries to console him.

When his parents return home, Holden slips out and visits his former and much-admired English teacher, Mr. Antolini, who expresses concern that Holden is headed for "a terrible fall". Mr. Antolini advises him to begin applying himself and provides Holden with a place to sleep. Holden is upset when he wakes up to find Mr. Antolini patting his head, which he interprets as a sexual advance. He leaves and spends the rest of the night in a waiting room at Grand Central Terminal, where he sinks further into despair and expresses regret over leaving Mr. Antolini. He spends most of the morning wandering Fifth Avenue.

Losing hope of finding belonging or companionship in the city, Holden impulsively decides that he will head out West and live a reclusive lifestyle as a deaf-mute gas station attendant living in a log cabin. He decides to see Phoebe at lunchtime to explain his plan and say goodbye. While visiting Phoebe's school, Holden sees graffiti containing a curse word and becomes distressed by the thought of children learning the word's meaning and tarnishing their innocence. When he meets Phoebe at the Metropolitan Museum of Art, she arrives with a suitcase and asks to go with him, even though she was looking forward to acting as Benedict Arnold in a play that Friday. Holden refuses to let her come with him, which upsets Phoebe. He tries to cheer her up by allowing her to skip school and taking her to the Central Park Zoo, but she remains angry. They eventually reach the zoo's carousel, where Phoebe reconciles with Holden after he buys her a ticket. Holden is finally filled with happiness and joy at the sight of Phoebe riding the carousel.

Holden finally alludes to encountering his parents that night and "getting sick", mentioning that he will be attending another school in September. Holden says he doesn't want to tell anything more because talking about them has made him miss his former classmates.

History
Various older stories by Salinger contain characters similar to those in The Catcher in the Rye. While at Columbia University, Salinger wrote a short story called "The Young Folks" in Whit Burnett's class; one character from this story has been described as a "thinly penciled prototype of Sally Hayes". In November 1941 he sold the story "Slight Rebellion off Madison", which featured Holden Caulfield, to The New Yorker, but it wasn't published until December 21, 1946, due to World War II. The story "I'm Crazy", which was published in the December 22, 1945 issue of Collier's, contained material that was later used in The Catcher in the Rye.

In 1946, The New Yorker accepted a 90-page manuscript about Holden Caulfield for publication, but Salinger later withdrew it.

Writing style
The Catcher in the Rye is narrated in a subjective style from the point of view of Holden Caulfield, following his exact thought processes. There is flow in the seemingly disjointed ideas and episodes; for example, as Holden sits in a chair in his dorm, minor events, such as picking up a book or looking at a table, unfold into discussions about experiences.

Critical reviews affirm that the novel accurately reflected the teenage colloquial speech of the time. Words and phrases that appear frequently include:
 "Old" – term of familiarity or endearment
 "Phony" – superficially acting a certain way only to change others’ perceptions
 "That killed me" – one found that hilarious or astonishing
 "Flit" – homosexual
 "Crumbum" or "crumby" – inadequate, insufficient, disappointing
 "Snowing" – sweet-talking
 "I got a bang out of that" – one found it hilarious or exciting
 "Shoot the bull" "bull session" – have a conversation containing false elements
 "Give her the time" – sexual intercourse
 "Necking" – passionate kissing especially on the neck (clothes on)
 "Chew the fat" or "chew the rag" – small talk
 "Rubbering" or "rubbernecks" – idle onlooking/onlookers
 "The can" – the bathroom
 "Prince of a guy" – fine fellow (however often used sarcastically)
 "Prostitute" – sellout or phony (e.g. in regard to his brother D.B. who is a writer: "Now he's out in Hollywood being a prostitute")

Interpretations
Bruce Brooks held that Holden's attitude remains unchanged at story's end, implying no maturation, thus differentiating the novel from young adult fiction.
In contrast, Louis Menand thought that teachers assign the novel because of the optimistic ending, to teach adolescent readers that "alienation is just a phase." While Brooks maintained that Holden acts his age, Menand claimed that Holden thinks as an adult, given his ability to accurately perceive people and their motives. Others highlight the dilemma of Holden's state, in between adolescence and adulthood. Holden is quick to become emotional. "I felt sorry as hell for..." is a phrase he often uses. It is often said that Holden changes at the end, when he watches Phoebe on the carousel, and he talks about the golden ring and how it's good for kids to try and grab it.

Peter Beidler in his A Reader's Companion to J. D. Salinger's "The Catcher in the Rye", identifies the movie that the prostitute "Sunny" refers to. In chapter 13 she says that in the movie a boy falls off a boat. The movie is Captains Courageous (1937), starring Spencer Tracy. Sunny says that Holden looks like the boy who fell off the boat. Beidler shows a still of the boy, played by child-actor Freddie Bartholomew.

Each Caulfield child has literary talent. D.B. writes screenplays in Hollywood; Holden also reveres D.B. for his writing skill (Holden's own best subject), but he also despises Hollywood industry-based movies, considering them the ultimate in "phony" as the writer has no space for his own imagination and describes D.B.'s move to Hollywood to write for films as "prostituting himself"; Allie wrote poetry on his baseball glove; and Phoebe is a diarist.
This "catcher in the rye" is an analogy for Holden, who admires in children attributes that he often struggles to find in adults, like innocence, kindness, spontaneity, and generosity. Falling off the cliff could be a progression into the adult world that surrounds him and that he strongly criticizes. Later, Phoebe and Holden exchange roles as the "catcher" and the "fallen"; he gives her his hunting hat, the catcher's symbol, and becomes the fallen as Phoebe becomes the catcher.

In their biography of Salinger, David Shields and Shane Salerno argue that: "The Catcher in the Rye can best be understood as a disguised war novel." Salinger witnessed the horrors of World War II, but rather than writing a combat novel, Salinger, according to Shields and Salerno, "took the trauma of war and embedded it within what looked to the naked eye like a coming-of-age novel."

Reception
The Catcher in the Rye has been consistently listed as one of the best novels of the twentieth century. Shortly after its publication, in an article for The New York Times, Nash K. Burger called it "an unusually brilliant novel," while James Stern wrote an admiring review of the book in a voice imitating Holden's. George H. W. Bush called it a "marvelous book," listing it among the books that inspired him. In June 2009, the BBC's Finlo Rohrer wrote that, 58 years since publication, the book is still regarded "as the defining work on what it is like to be a teenager." Adam Gopnik considers it one of the "three perfect books" in American literature, along with Adventures of Huckleberry Finn and The Great Gatsby, and believes that "no book has ever captured a city better than Catcher in the Rye captured New York in the fifties." In an appraisal of The Catcher in the Rye written after the death of J. D. Salinger, Jeff Pruchnic says the novel has retained its appeal for many generations. Pruchnic describes Holden as a "teenage protagonist frozen midcentury but destined to be discovered by those of a similar age in every generation to come." Bill Gates said that The Catcher in the Rye is one of his favorite books.

Not all reception has been positive. The book has had its share of naysayers, including the longtime Washington Post book critic Jonathan Yardley, who, in 2004, wrote that the experience of rereading the novel after several decades proved to be "a painful experience: The combination of Salinger's execrable prose and Caulfield's jejune narcissism produced effects comparable to mainlining castor oil." Yardley described the novel as among the worst popular books in the annals of American literature. "Why," Yardley asked, "do English teachers, whose responsibility is to teach good writing, repeatedly and reflexively require students to read a book as badly written as this one?" According to Rohrer, many contemporary readers, as Yardley found, "just cannot understand what the fuss is about.... many of these readers are disappointed that the novel fails to meet the expectations generated by the mystique it is shrouded in. J. D. Salinger has done his part to enhance this mystique. That is to say, he has done nothing." Rohrer assessed the reasons behind both the popularity and criticism of the book, saying that it "captures existential teenage angst" and has a "complex central character" and "accessible conversational style"; while at the same time some readers may dislike the "use of 1940s New York vernacular" and the excessive "whining" of the "self-obsessed character."

Censorship and use in schools
In 1960, a teacher in Tulsa, Oklahoma was fired for assigning the novel in class. She was later reinstated. Between 1961 and 1982, The Catcher in the Rye was the most censored book in high schools and libraries in the United States. The book was briefly banned in the Issaquah, Washington, high schools in 1978 when three members of the School Board alleged the book was part of an "overall communist plot." This ban did not last long, and the offended board members were immediately recalled and removed in a special election. In 1981, it was both the most censored book and the second most taught book in public schools in the United States. According to the American Library Association, The Catcher in the Rye was the 10th most frequently challenged book from 1990 to 1999. It was one of the ten most challenged books of 2005, and although it had been off the list for three years, it reappeared in the list of most challenged books of 2009.

The challenges generally begin with Holden's frequent use of vulgar language; other reasons include sexual references, blasphemy, undermining of family values and moral codes, encouragement of rebellion, and promotion of drinking, smoking, lying, promiscuity, and sexual abuse. This book was written for an adult audience, which often forms the foundation of many challengers' arguments against it. Often the challengers have been unfamiliar with the plot itself. Shelley Keller-Gage, a high school teacher who faced objections after assigning the novel in her class, noted that "the challengers are being just like Holden... They are trying to be catchers in the rye." A Streisand effect has been that this incident caused people to put themselves on the waiting list to borrow the novel, when there was no waiting list before.

Violent reactions

Several shootings have been associated with Salinger's novel, including Robert John Bardo's murder of Rebecca Schaeffer and John Hinckley Jr.'s assassination attempt on Ronald Reagan. Additionally, after fatally shooting John Lennon, Mark David Chapman was arrested with a copy of the book that he had purchased that same day, inside of which he had written: "To Holden Caulfield, From Holden Caulfield, This is my statement".

Attempted adaptations

In film
Early in his career, Salinger expressed a willingness to have his work adapted for the screen. In 1949, a critically panned film version of his short story "Uncle Wiggily in Connecticut" was released; renamed My Foolish Heart, the film took great liberties with Salinger's plot and is widely considered to be among the reasons that Salinger refused to allow any subsequent film adaptations of his work. The enduring success of The Catcher in the Rye, however, has resulted in repeated attempts to secure the novel's screen rights.

When The Catcher in the Rye was first released, many offers were made to adapt it for the screen, including one from Samuel Goldwyn, producer of My Foolish Heart. In a letter written in the early 1950s, Salinger spoke of mounting a play in which he would play the role of Holden Caulfield opposite Margaret O'Brien, and, if he couldn't play the part himself, to "forget about it." Almost 50 years later, the writer Joyce Maynard definitively concluded, "The only person who might ever have played Holden Caulfield would have been J. D. Salinger."

Salinger told Maynard in the 1970s that Jerry Lewis "tried for years to get his hands on the part of Holden," the protagonist in the novel which Lewis had not read until he was in his thirties. Film industry figures including Marlon Brando, Jack Nicholson, Ralph Bakshi, Tobey Maguire and Leonardo DiCaprio have tried to make a film adaptation. In an interview with Premiere, John Cusack commented that his one regret about turning 21 was that he had become too old to play Holden Caulfield. Writer-director Billy Wilder recounted his abortive attempts to snare the novel's rights:

In 1961, Salinger denied Elia Kazan permission to direct a stage adaptation of Catcher for Broadway. Later, Salinger's agents received bids for the Catcher film rights from Harvey Weinstein and Steven Spielberg, neither of which was even passed on to Salinger for consideration.

In 2003, the BBC television program The Big Read featured The Catcher in the Rye, interspersing discussions of the novel with "a series of short films that featured an actor playing J. D. Salinger's adolescent antihero, Holden Caulfield." The show defended its unlicensed adaptation of the novel by claiming to be a "literary review", and no major charges were filed.

In 2008, the rights of Salinger's works were placed in the JD Salinger Literary Trust where Salinger was the sole trustee. Phyllis Westberg, who was Salinger's agent at Harold Ober Associates in New York, declined to say who the trustees are now that the author is dead. After Salinger died in 2010, Phyllis Westberg stated that nothing has changed in terms of licensing film, television, or stage rights of his works. A letter written by Salinger in 1957 revealed that he was open to an adaptation of The Catcher in the Rye released after his death. He wrote: "Firstly, it is possible that one day the rights will be sold. Since there's an ever-looming possibility that I won't die rich, I toy very seriously with the idea of leaving the unsold rights to my wife and daughter as a kind of insurance policy. It pleasures me no end, though, I might quickly add, to know that I won't have to see the results of the transaction." Salinger also wrote that he believed his novel was not suitable for film treatment, and that translating Holden Caulfield's first-person narrative into voice-over and dialogue would be contrived.

In 2020, Don Hahn revealed that Disney had almost made an animated movie titled Dufus which would have been an adaptation of The Catcher in the Rye "with German shepherds", most likely akin to Oliver & Company. The idea came from then CEO Michael Eisner who loved the book and wanted to do an adaptation. After being told that J. D. Salinger would not agree to sell the film rights, Eisner stated "Well, let's just do that kind of story, that kind of growing up, coming of age story."

Banned fan sequel
In 2009, the year before he died, Salinger successfully sued to stop the U.S. publication of a novel that presents Holden Caulfield as an old man. The novel's author, Fredrik Colting, commented: "call me an ignorant Swede, but the last thing I thought possible in the U.S. was that you banned books". The issue is complicated by the nature of Colting's book, 60 Years Later: Coming Through the Rye, which has been compared to fan fiction. Although commonly not authorized by writers, no legal action is usually taken against fan fiction, since it is rarely published commercially and thus involves no profit.

Legacy and use in popular culture

See also
 Book censorship in the United States
 Le Mondes 100 Books of the Century

References

Notes

Bibliography

Further reading

External links

 Book Drum illustrated profile of The Catcher in the Rye 
 Photos of the first edition of Catcher in the Rye
 Lawsuit targets "rip-off" of "Catcher in the Rye" – CNN

Fiction set in 1949
1951 American novels
American bildungsromans
Book censorship in the Republic of Ireland
English-language novels
Fiction with unreliable narrators
Literary realism
Little, Brown and Company books
Novels by J. D. Salinger
Novels about American prostitution
Novels set in California
Novels set in New York City
Novels set in Pennsylvania
New York City in fiction
Obscenity controversies in literature
Controversies in the United States
Trying to prevent adulthood in popular culture
Censored books
1951 debut novels
First-person narrative novels
Novels first published in serial form